Thomas Combezou (born 26 January 1987) is a French rugby union player. His position is Centre and he currently plays for Castres in France's top division of rugby union, the Top 14. He began his career with Clermont Auvergne before moving to La Rochelle in 2009. He transferred to Montpellier after La Rochelle's relegation in 2011, and then moved to Castres following the 2013–14 season.

Honours

Club 
 Castres
Top 14: 2017–18

References

1987 births
Living people
French rugby union players
People from Tulle
ASM Clermont Auvergne players
Stade Rochelais players
Castres Olympique players
Montpellier Hérault Rugby players
Rugby union centres
Rugby union wings
Sportspeople from Corrèze